Jack W. Meiland (1934–1998) was an American philosopher and educator. As a philosopher, Meiland is best known for his analyses of relativism, particularly on cognitive relativism. Meiland is also known for a "salvage operation" from the "paradox of relativism", the claim that relativists are absolutists about relativism.

From 1962 to 1997, Meiland taught at the Philosophy Department at the University of Michigan, where he was appointed Arthur F. Thurnau Professor in 1988.

In the College of Literature, Science, and the Arts (LS&A), Meiland served as Director of the Honors Program and then as the Associate Dean for Curriculum and Long-Range Planning.

Works
Scepticism and Historical Knowledge (1965)
Talking About Particulars (1970)
Nature of Intention (1970)
First Time in London (1979)
College Thinking: How to Get the Best Out of College (1981)
Relativism, Cognitive and Moral (1982), editor with Michael Krausz

See also
 American philosophy
 List of American philosophers

References
Obituary
Louis E. Loeb, "Jack W. Meiland, 1934-1998", Proceedings and Addresses of the American Philosophical Association, Vol. 73, No. 2 (November 1999), pp. 124–126

Notes

1934 births
1998 deaths
20th-century American philosophers
University of Michigan faculty